Nicholas Wachira (born 19 November 1982) is a Kenyan former middle-distance runner who competed mostly in the 800 metres. He represented his country at the 2001 and 2003 World Championships reaching semifinals at both occasions. In addition, he won gold medals at the 1999 World Youth and 2000 World Junior Championships.

Competition record

Personal bests
Outdoor
400 metres – 47.93 (Bydgoszcz 1999)
800 metres – 1:44.34 (Nairobi 2003)
1000 metres – 2:18.13 (Nice 2001)
1500 metres – 3:38.44 (Zürich 2004)
Indoor
800 metres – 1:47.37 (Stuttgart 2003)
1000 metres – 2:23.64 (Boston 2004)

References

1982 births
Living people
Kenyan male middle-distance runners
World Athletics Championships athletes for Kenya